Peddireddy Ramachandra Reddy is an Indian politician from the state of Andhra Pradesh. He is serving as Minister of Energy, Forest, Environment, Science and Technology, Mines and Geology in the Andhra Pradesh government since April 2022. Earlier he served as the Panchayat Raj and Rural Development and Mines and Geology Minister during 2019–2022. Reddy was elected to the Andhra Pradesh Legislative Assembly elected from YSR Congress Party for the Punganur Assembly constituency in 2019.

He won the 2009 elections from Punganur Assembly constituency and was appointed the Forest Minister in Y. S. Rajasekhara Reddy ministry. Post the death of Y. S. Rajasekhara Reddy, he quit the ministerial post citing differences with Kiran Kumar Reddy, the later Chief minister of Andhra Pradesh. In 2013, he joined YSR Congress Party. He later won 2014 elections and 2019 elections.

He hails from Chittoor district and holds a PhD in sociology.

References 

Year of birth missing (living people)
People from Chittoor district
Andhra Pradesh MLAs 2009–2014
Andhra Pradesh MLAs 2014–2019
Andhra Pradesh MLAs 2019–2024
State cabinet ministers of Andhra Pradesh
Living people